Jule Campbell ( – November 19, 2022) was an American magazine editor. She was the founding editor of the Sports Illustrated Swimsuit Issue. She joined Sports Illustrated in the 1960s after beginning her career at Glamour magazine.

References 

1920s births
2022 deaths
American editors